Country rock is a genre of music which fuses rock and country. It was developed by rock musicians who began to record country-flavored records in the late 1960s and early 1970s. These musicians recorded rock records using country themes, vocal styles, and additional instrumentation, most characteristically pedal steel guitars. Country rock began with artists like Buffalo Springfield, Michael Nesmith, Bob Dylan, Nitty Gritty Dirt Band, the Byrds, the Flying Burrito Brothers, The International Submarine Band and others, reaching its greatest popularity in the 1970s with artists such as Emmylou Harris, the Eagles, the New Riders of the Purple Sage, Linda Ronstadt, Poco, Charlie Daniels Band, and Pure Prairie League. Country rock also influenced artists in other genres, including The Band, the Grateful Dead, Creedence Clearwater Revival, The Rolling Stones, and George Harrison's solo work, as well as playing a part in the development of Southern rock.

Characteristics
Rock and roll has usually been seen as a combination of rhythm and blues and country music, a fusion particularly evident in 1950s rockabilly. There has also been cross-pollination throughout the history of both genres; however, the term “country-rock” is used generally to refer to the wave of rock musicians of the late 1960s and early 1970s who began recording rock songs with country themes, vocal styles, and additional instrumentation, most characteristically pedal steel guitars. John Einarson states that, "[f]rom a variety of perspectives and motivations, these musicians either played country with a rock & roll attitude, or added a country feel to rock, or folk, or bluegrass. There was no formula".

History

Origins

Country influences can be heard on rock records through the 1960s, including the Beatles' 1964 recordings "I'll Cry Instead", "Baby's in Black", "I Don't Want to Spoil the Party", and their 1965 recording "I've Just Seen A Face", the Byrds' 1965 cover version of Porter Wagoner's "Satisfied Mind", or the Rolling Stones "High and Dry" (1966), as well as Buffalo Springfield's "Go and Say Goodbye" (1966) and "Kind Woman" (1968). According to The Encyclopedia of Country Music, the Beatles' "I Don't Want to Spoil the Party", their cover of the Buck Owens country hit "Act Naturally" and their 1965 album Rubber Soul can all be seen "with hindsight" as examples of country rock.

Former TV teen idol & rockabilly recording artist Ricky Nelson pioneered the Country Rock sound as the frontman for his Stone Canyon Band and recorded the 1966 album "Bright Lights & Country Music" and the 1967 album "Country Fever". Bassist Randy Meisner joined briefly in 1970 after leaving Poco and before joining Eagles.

In 1966, as many rock artists moved increasingly towards expansive and experimental psychedelia, Bob Dylan spearheaded the back-to-basics roots revival when he went to Nashville to record the album Blonde on Blonde, playing with notable local musicians like Charlie McCoy. This, and the subsequent more clearly country-influenced albums, John Wesley Harding (1967) and Nashville Skyline (1969), have been seen as creating the genre of country folk, a route pursued by a number of, largely acoustic, folk musicians.

Dylan's lead was also followed by the Byrds, who were joined by Gram Parsons in 1968. Parsons had mixed country with rock, blues and folk to create what he called "Cosmic American Music". Earlier in the year Parsons had released Safe at Home (although the principal recording for the album had taken place in mid-1967) with the International Submarine Band, which made extensive use of pedal steel and is seen by some as the first true country-rock album. The result of Parsons' brief tenure in the Byrds was Sweetheart of the Rodeo (1968), generally considered one of the finest and most influential recordings in the genre. The Byrds continued in the same vein, but Parsons left before the album was released to join another ex-Byrds member Chris Hillman in forming the Flying Burrito Brothers. The Byrds hired guitarist Clarence White and drummer Gene Parsons, both from the  country band Nashville West. The Flying Burrito Brothers recorded the albums The Gilded Palace of Sin (1969) and Burrito Deluxe (1970), which helped establish the respectability and parameters of the genre, before Parsons departed to pursue a solo career.

Expansion

Country rock was a particularly popular style in the California music scene of the late 1960s, and was adopted by bands including Hearts and Flowers, Poco (formed by Richie Furay and Jim Messina, formerly of the Buffalo Springfield) and New Riders of the Purple Sage. Some folk-rockers followed the Byrds into the genre, among them the Beau Brummels and the Nitty Gritty Dirt Band. A number of performers also enjoyed a renaissance by adopting country sounds, including: the Beatles, who re-explored elements of country in songs such as "Rocky Raccoon" and "Don't Pass Me By" from their 1968 self-titled double album (often referred to as the "White Album"), and "Octopus's Garden" from Abbey Road (1969); the Everly Brothers, whose Roots album (1968) is usually considered some of their finest work; John Fogerty, who left Creedence Clearwater Revival behind for the country sounds of the Blue Ridge Rangers (1972); Mike Nesmith, who had experimented with country sounds while with the Monkees, formed the First National Band; and Neil Young who moved in and out of the genre throughout his career. One of the few acts to successfully move from the country side towards rock were the bluegrass band the Dillards. Doug Dillard left the band to form the group Dillard & Clark with ex-Byrds member Gene Clark and Bernie Leadon.

Peak

The greatest commercial success for country rock came in the 1970s, with the Doobie Brothers mixing in elements of R&B, Emmylou Harris (the former singer with Parsons) becoming a star on country radio,  and Linda Ronstadt, the "Queen of country-rock", creating a highly successful pop-oriented brand of the genre. Pure Prairie League, formed in Ohio in 1969 by Craig Fuller, had both critical and commercial success with 5 straight Top 40 LP releases, including Bustin' Out (1972), acclaimed by Allmusic critic Richard Foss as "an album that is unequaled in country-rock", and Two Lane Highway, described by Rolling Stone as "a worthy companion to the likes of the Byrds' Sweetheart of the Rodeo and other gems of the genre". Former Poco and Buffalo Springfield member Jim Messina joined Kenny Loggins in a very successful duo, while former members of Ronstadt's backing band went on to form the Eagles (two members of which were from the Flying Burrito Brothers and Poco), who emerged as one of the most successful rock acts of all time, producing albums that included Desperado (1973) and Hotel California (1976). However, the principal country rock influence in the Eagles came from Bernie Leadon, formerly of the Flying Burrito Brothers, and the Eagles are perceived as shifting towards hard rock after he left the band in late 1975. The Ozark Mountain Daredevils had hit singles “If You Wanna Get To Heaven” (1974) and "Jackie Blue" (1975), the latter of which peaked at #3 on the Billboard Hot 100 in 1975. The Bellamy Brothers had the hit "Let Your Love Flow"(1976). In 1979, the Southern rock Charlie Daniels Band moved to a more country direction, released a song with strong bluegrass influence, "The Devil Went Down to Georgia", and the song crossed over and became a hit on the pop chart.

Legacy
Outside its handful of stars, country rock's greatest significance was on artists in other genres, including the Band, Grateful Dead, Creedence Clearwater Revival, the Rolling Stones and George Harrison's solo work. It also played a part in the development of Southern rock, which, although largely derived from blues rock, had a distinct southern lilt, and it paved the way for parts of the alternative country movement. The genre declined in popularity in the late 1970s, but some established artists, including Neil Young, have continued to record country-tinged rock into the twenty-first century. Japan even took influence in the 70s with country rock mainly in the kayokyoku genre. Artists such as Takuro Yoshida, Kousetsu Minami and his band Kaguyahime. Masa Takagi, Lily and Saori Minami have often dabbled with country rock in their music. Country rock has survived as a cult force in Texas, where acts including the Flatlanders, Joe Ely, Butch Hancock, Jimmie Dale Gilmore and California-based Richard Brooker have collaborated and recorded. Other performers have produced occasional recordings in the genre, including Elvis Costello's Almost Blue (1981) and the Robert Plant and Alison Krauss collaboration Raising Sand, which was one of the most commercially successful albums of 2007. In 2013 British country rock band Rocky and the Natives released Let's Hear It for the Old Guys with two American members, drummer Andy Newmark and acoustic guitarist Bob Rafkin. Rafkin had written "Lazy Waters" for The Byrds from the 1971 album Farther Along, and Andy Newmark had played on the 1973 Gene Parsons album Kindling.  Canadian country rock band Blue Rodeo has found considerable success in Canada, selling multi-platinum albums throughout the 1980's and 1990's, and continues to receive frequent radio airplay on Canadian radio stations.  Later in 2013 Rocky and the Natives' country rock cover of John Lennon's "Tight A$" was included on the Lennon Bermuda album.

A revival of country music blended with rock features in the 2020s was titled "ronky tonk" in the music press, with acts such as Zach Bryan, Jackson Dean, and Bailey Zimmerman identified by Billboard.

See also

List of country rock albums
List of country rock musicians

References

 
Country music genres
American rock music genres
Rock music genres
Fusion music genres